This is a list of the ribbons of the French military and civil awards.

French national orders

French ministerial orders

French military decorations

Medals of Honor

French commemorative awards

Other awards

Order of precedence
Official list, dated June 19, 2003, signed by General Jean-Philippe Douin, Grand Chancellor of the Legion of Honour:

- LÉGION D’HONNEUR

- CROIX DE LA LIBÉRATION

- MÉDAILLE MILITAIRE

- ORDRE NATIONAL DU MÉRITE

- CROIX DE GUERRE 1914-1918

- CROIX DE GUERRE 1939-1945

- CROIX DE GUERRE DES THÉÂTRES D’OPÉRATIONS EXTÉRIEURES

- CROIX DE LA VALEUR MILITAIRE

- MÉDAILLE DE LA GENDARMERIE NATIONALE (depuis le décret n° 2004-733 du 26 juillet 2004)

- MÉDAILLE DE LA RÉSISTANCE

- PALMES ACADÉMIQUES

- MÉRITE AGRICOLE

- MÉRITE MARITIME

- ARTS ET LETTRES

- MÉDAILLE DES ÉVADÉS

- CROIX DU COMBATTANT VOLONTAIRE 1914-1918

- CROIX DU COMBATTANT VOLONTAIRE

- CROIX DU COMBATTANT VOLONTAIRE DE LA RÉSISTANCE

- CROIX DU COMBATTANT

- MÉDAILLE DE LA RECONNAISSANCE FRANÇAISE

- MÉDAILLE DE L’AÉRONAUTIQUE

- MÉDAILLE D’OUTRE-MER (ex-Médaille Coloniale)

- MÉDAILLE D’OR DE LA DÉFENSE NATIONALE POUR CITATION SANS CROIX (depuis le décret n° 2004-624 du 25 juin 2004)

- MÉDAILLE DE LA DÉFENSE NATIONALE

- MÉDAILLE DES SERVICES MILITAIRES VOLONTAIRES

- HONOR MEDALS OF THE DIFFERENT MINISTERIAL DEPARTMENTS

- MÉDAILLE D’AFRIQUE DU NORD & MÉDAILLE DE RECONNAISSANCE DE LA NATION

- COMMEMORATIVE MEDALS AND OTHER EQUIVALENT

See also
 Military awards and decorations of France
 Order (decoration)
 State decoration

Sources 
 Les décorations françaises 
  Site très complet traitant des décorations militaires et civiles françaises

 
Ribbon symbolism